Sefwi-Akontombra District is one of the nine districts in Western North Region, Ghana. Originally it was formerly part of the then-larger Sefwi-Wiawso District in 1988, which was created from the former Sefwi-Bibiani District Council, until the southwest part of the district was split off to create Sefwi-Akontombra District on 29 February 2008; thus the remaining part was retained as Sefwi-Wiawso District (which it was later elevated to municipal district assembly status in March 2012 (effectively 28 June 2012) to become Sefwi-Wiawso Municipal District). The district assembly is located in the northeast part of Western North Region and has Akontombra as its capital town.

Sources
 
 GhanaDistricts.com

References

Districts of the Western North Region